This table of works by the Danish composer Carl Nielsen initially lists them by genre and composition date within a genre.

History 
Nielsen wrote music in many genres, notably symphonies, concertos and choral music, but also operas and incidental music, chamber music, solo works for violin, piano and organ as well as a considerable number of songs.

Nielsen assigned an opus number only to selected compositions, from Op 1 for the Suite for String Orchestra in 1888 to Op 58 for the organ work  (1930–1931). The opus number 59 was assigned posthumously to three piano pieces  (1928).

The FS catalogue was first compiled in 1965 by Dan Fog and Torben Schousboe. It is arranged roughly in chronological order in accordance with the publication date of the works, initially up to FS 161. Compositions discovered after 1965 were assigned higher numbers, in connection with the publication of a Nielsen CD in 1998.

The CNW (Catalogue of Carl Nielsen's Works), compiled by the Royal Danish Library, covers all of Nielsen's known works (419 in all). The CNW catalogue numbers link to the individual catalogue entries. Each entry gives a brief description of the work in English together with links to background information and scores from the Carl Nielsen Edition. In contrast to FS, CNW numbers each of Nielsen's songs individually instead of numbering the publications in which they appeared.

Table of compositions

Details of collections 

For some works, details are given below. The details of songs, such as collections and incidental music, are found in the List of songs composed by Carl Nielsen.

FS 3 

Miscellaneous unpublished early manuscripts in the Royal Library, Copenhagen
3a Various brass trios and quartets (1879–1983, lost)
3b Sonata No. 1 for violin and piano in G major (1881–1882)
3c Various movements for string quartet (1883–1887)
3d String Quartet in D minor (1882–1883).
3e Duo (in three movements) in A major for two violins (1882–1883).
3f  (Two character pieces) for piano (1882–1883)
3g  (Lullaby) (1883)
3h Fantasy Piece for clarinet and piano in G minor (1881 or 1883–1885)
3i Piano Trio in G major (1883)
3k String Quartet in F major (1887)
3l "" (A moment of pleasure, an age of pain), song for men's choir, text by J. P. Jacobsen (1887)
3m "" (Jean (Of a' the airts the wind can blaw), song for men's choir, text by Robert Burns; translated by Caralis (1887)
3n-s Various songs on texts by E. Aarestrup, J. S. Welhaven, G. B. Byron, P. B. Shelley, J. J. Callanan, R. Burns; translated by Caralis, a pseudonym for C. Preetzman (1887)
3t "" (To Athenea, who may command him anything), song for men's choir, text by Robert Herrick; translated by Caralis (1887)
3u "" (Earlier I dreamt every single night), song for men's choir, text by J. P. Jacobsen (1887)

FS 22 

Humoreske Bagateller. For piano. (1894–1897)
 " ("How do you do?")
 " ("The Jumping Jack")
 " ("The Spinning-top")
 " ("A Little Slow Waltz")
 " ("Doll's march")
 " ("The Musical Box")

FS 51 

Songs arranged for unison chorus to be used at schools (FS 35, 42, 43, 44, 45, and Vi frie Folk, text by V. Rørdam, written for the Olympic Games in London, 1908)

See also 
List of songs composed by Carl Nielsen

Notes

References

Bibliography 
Catalogues

  Also online: .
  See pages 222–227, listed by genre with FS and opus numbers.
  Listed by FS number.
  See pages 212–230, chronological list with opus numbers compiled by Torben Meyer. Reprinted by Hyperion Press .
  See pages 251–257, listed by FS number with opus numbers.

Other citations

External links 
  Complete list of Nielsen's works compiled for his 150th anniversary.

 
Nielsen, Carl